Notre-Dame Basilica is a basilica in the historic district of Old Montreal, in Montreal, Quebec, Canada. The church is located at 110 Notre-Dame Street West, at the corner of Saint Sulpice Street. It is located next to the Saint-Sulpice Seminary and faces the Place d'Armes square.

The interior of the church is amongst the most dramatic in the world and regarded as a masterpiece of Gothic Revival architecture. The vaults are coloured deep blue and decorated with golden stars, and the rest of the sanctuary is decorated in blues, azures, reds, purples, silver, and gold. It is filled with hundreds of intricate wooden carvings and several religious statues. Unusual for a church, the stained glass windows along the walls of the sanctuary do not depict biblical scenes, but rather scenes from the religious history of Montreal. It also has a Casavant Frères pipe organ, dated 1891, which comprises four keyboards, 92 stops using electromagnetic action and an adjustable combination system, 7000 individual pipes and a pedal board.

Approximately 11 million people visit Notre-Dame Basilica every year, making it one of the most visited monuments in North America. In 2023, Notre-Dame was named the 6th most beautiful building in the world by Angi, a home service publication which analyzes TripAdvisor reviews. The publication ranked Notre-Dame de Paris second and Barcelona's Sagrada Família first.

History
In 1657, the Roman Catholic Sulpicians arrived in Ville-Marie, now known as Montreal; six years later, the seigneury of the island was vested in them. They ruled until 1840. The parish they founded was dedicated to the Holy Name of Mary, and the parish church of Notre-Dame was built on the site in 1672. François Baillairgé, an architect, designed the interior decoration and choir 1785–95; facade and vault decoration, 1818. 
The church served as the first cathedral of the Diocese of Montreal from 1821 to 1822. 

By 1824 the congregation had completely outgrown the church, and James O'Donnell, an Irish-American Anglican from New York City, was commissioned to design the new building, with a goal of accommodating a congregation of up to 10,000. O'Donnell was a proponent of the Gothic Revival architectural movement, and designed the church as such. He intended for a terrace to be built on the exterior of the church, but this was never completed due to a lack of funding. He is the only person buried in the church's crypt. O'Donnell converted to Roman Catholicism on his deathbed and was thus buried in the crypt.

The primary construction took place between 1824 and 1829. The cornerstone was laid at Place d'Armes on September 1, 1824. The sanctuary was finished in 1830, and the first tower in 1841, the second in 1843. O'Donnell designed the towers to be traditionally Gothic, and intended for them to be seen from any point in the city. Following O'Donnell's death, John Ostell, an English-born architect, finished the towers according to O'Donnell's original plans. Upon completion, the church was the largest in North America, and remained so for over fifty years. Samuel Russell Warren constructed a new organ in 1858. The facade of the church was completed in 1865, and included three statues by French sculptor Henri Bouriché: Saint-Joseph, the Virgin Mary, and Saint Jean-Baptiste. 

The interior took much longer, and Victor Bourgeau, who also worked on Montreal's Mary, Queen of the World Cathedral, worked on it from 1872 to 1879. Stonemason John Redpath was a major participant in the construction of the Basilica. The sanctuary originally hosted a large canopy, but because it caused a lighting effect that would blind the congregation, the interior designs were reworked by Bourgeau and Victor Rousselot, the current priest. They were inspired by the Sainte-Chapelle in Paris, with gold leaf motifs paired with brightly painted columns.

Because of the splendour and grand scale of the church, a more intimate chapel, Chapelle du Sacré-Cœur (Chapel of the Sacred Heart), was built behind it, along with some offices and a sacristy. It was completed in 1888. In 1886, Casavant Frères began constructing a new 32-foot pipe organ at the church, completing it in 1891. It was notably the first organ with adjustable-combination pedals to be operated by electricity.

Arson destroyed the Sacré-Cœur Chapel on December 8, 1978. It was rebuilt with the first two levels reproduced from old drawings and photographs, with modern vaulting and reredos and an immense bronze altarpiece by Quebec sculptor Charles Daudelin.

Notre-Dame Church was raised to the status of a minor basilica by Pope John Paul II on April 21, 1982. The Notre-Dame Roman Catholic Church was designated a National Historic Site of Canada in 1989.

On May 31, 2000, the provincial state funeral for former Montreal Canadiens superstar Maurice "Rocket" Richard was held in front of thousands, both inside and outside the Basilica.

On October 3, 2000, Justin Trudeau gave his eulogy just steps from the High Altar during the state funeral of Pierre Trudeau, his father and Canada's 15th prime minister.

It was also the setting of Celine Dion's December 17, 1994, wedding to René Angélil and hosted the funeral service for Angélil on January 22, 2016.

In the summer of 2014, a French collector named Pierre-Jean Chalencon displayed a variety of artifacts that belonged to Napoleon Bonaparte. These items included clothing, weapons, and furniture, and were on display in the crypt on the basilica.

In April 2019, following the Notre-Dame de Paris fire, Montreal's Notre-Dame announced that it would accept donations to aid in the Paris cathedral's reconstruction.

Bells 
Both towers have bells, the West Tower (La Persévérance), has a bourdon bell nicknamed Jean-Baptiste, cast in John Dod Ward’s Eagle Foundry in 1848. Jean-Baptiste weighs 10,900 kg and tolled only on special occasions such as funerals, great church festivals and even Christmas Eve. The East Tower (La Temperance), houses a ten-bell carillon from the same foundry in May 24, 1842.

Public access
The basilica offers musical programming of choral and organ performances.  It is a tradition among many Montrealers to attend the annual performance of Handel's Messiah every Christmas.

More than 11 million people visit Notre-Dame every year, only one million fewer than Notre-Dame de Paris.

Organists

Jean Girard (1725–1765)
Guillaume Mechtler (1792–1832)
Jean-Chrysostome Brauneis II (1833–1844)
Leonard Eglauch (1845)
Jean-Baptiste Labelle (1849–1891)
Alcibiade Béique (1891–1896)
Joseph-Daniel Dussault (1896–1921, with the exception of eight months in 1916)
August Liessens (1916)
Benoît Poirier (1921–1954)
Pierre Grandmaison (1973–present)

See also
Adam Charles Gustave Desmazures
List of tallest structures built before the 20th century

References

Sources
Rémillard, François (1992). Old Montreal – A Walking Tour, Ministère des Affaires culturelles du Québec.
Livesey, Herbert Bailey (2003). Frommer's 2004 Montreal & Quebec City, Frommer's, 104. .

External links

Basilique Notre-Dame de Montréal
Visite Interactive de la Basilique

Notre-Dame de Montreal
Gothic Revival architecture in Montreal
Gothic Revival church buildings in Canada
National Historic Sites in Quebec
Old Montreal
Religious buildings and structures in Canada destroyed by arson
Roman Catholic churches completed in 1888
N
Roman Catholic churches on the National Historic Sites of Canada register
19th-century Roman Catholic church buildings in Canada